Pablo Damián Abraham Capelli (born 30 March 1979) is an Argentine football manager. He was most recently the coach of Sport Rosario.

Managerial career
In 2012, he was hired by Chilean third-tier side Fernández Vial after working as Jorge Sampaoli’s assistant coach at Universidad de Chile the previous season, where he helped to Sampaoli to reach the first treble in the club's history (Apertura and Clausura titles and the 2011 Copa Sudamericana).

In January 2014 he was hired by Primera División de Chile club Ñublense to face the rest of the 2013–14 season. However, at the end of it, Abraham was fired.

After brief spells at Deportes Temuco and Magallanes during the 2014–15 and the 2015–16 seasons, he returned to Ñublense in mid-2016.

On 20 December 2017, Abraham signed for Sport Rosario. Abraham quit on 3 March 2018. Since then Pablo resides in England with his wife and child.

References

External links
 
 Ceroacero Profile
 

1979 births
Living people
Argentine football managers
Expatriate football managers in Chile
Arturo Fernández Vial managers
Curicó Unido managers
Ñublense managers
Deportes Temuco managers
Magallanes managers
Sport Rosario managers